George Douglas, 4th Lord Mordington, died 10 June 1741 at Covent Garden, London, was the son and heir of James Douglas, 3rd Lord Mordington by his wife Anne, daughter of Alexander Seton, 1st Viscount of Kingston. George, Lord Mordington, is described by several authorities as a political writer.

He obtained a prominent mention in Walpole's Royal and Noble Authors (Parks edition, vol.v, p. 147) as the author of a work called The Great Blessing of a Monarchical Government – "when fenced about with and bounded by the laws, and these laws secured and observed by the monarch". Mordington added "that as a Popish government is inconsistent with the true happiness of these kingdoms, so great also are the miseries and confusions of anarchy. Most humbly dedicated to His Majesty by George Douglas, Lord Mordington, London, 1724."

Two pieces against a weekly paper called the Independent Whig are also mentioned by Walpole as being written by Lord Mordington.

He married Catherine (d. June 1741) daughter of Dr.Robert Lauder, Rector of Shenley, Hertfordshire, by his wife Mary, née Snow. They had three children:

their son and heir: Charles Douglas, 5th Lord Mordington, a Jacobite;
and two daughters:

 Campbellina,
 Mary (d.22 July 1791) de jure Baroness Mordington, who married William Weaver, an Officer in the Royal Horse Guards (d. 28 April 1796, Hallow Park, Worcestershire, England), who fought at the battle of Dettingen and the battle of Fontenoy.

References
 The Peerage of Scotland, published by Peter Brown, Edinburgh, 1834, p. 176.
 The Scottish Nation, by William Anderson, Edinburgh, 1867, vol.7, p. 206.

1741 deaths
Lords of Parliament
Scottish political writers
Year of birth unknown